Edgardo Arnulfo Mira Abrego (born 10 March 1993) is a former Salvadoran footballer who plays as a defender.

International career
Mira officially received his first cap on 2 June 2018 in a friendly match against Honduras.

References

External links
  

1993 births
Living people
Association football defenders
Salvadoran footballers
Salvadoran expatriate footballers
El Salvador international footballers
C.D. Chalatenango footballers
Deportivo Chiantla players
Salvadoran people of Guatemalan descent
Sportspeople of Guatemalan descent